...When Love Happens is a 2014 Nigerian romantic comedy film co-produced and directed by Seyi Babatope. It stars Weruche Opia, OC Ukeje, Beverly Naya, Oreka Godis, Gideon Okeke, Bukky Wright, Desmond Elliot, Wale Ojo, Keppy Ekpenyong and Shafy Bello. The film tells the story of Mo, a successful events planner whose job is to help other people plan their weddings, but finds it hard to get into a relationship.

Cast
Weruche Opia as Moduroti 'Mo' Bankole-Smith
Gideon Okeke as Tobe Okoronkwo
Beverly Naya as Jennifer Obigwe
Oreka Godis as Tseju
OC Ukeje as Dare Laguda
Keppy Ekpenyong as Tunde Bankole-Smith
Shafy Bello as Anna Bankole-Smith
Wale Ojo as Oladele Laguda
Bukky Wright as Mrs Laguda
Desmond Elliot as Lanre
Helen Paul as Chika
Blossom Chukwujekwu as Ike
KC Ejelonu as KC
Femi Brainard as 
Enyinna Nwigwe as

Production
Production of the film took 7 months. Principal photography, which lasted for two weeks, commenced in Lagos around February 2014.

Release
Behind the scenes short documentary videos were constantly released on YouTube from August through September 2014. A teaser trailer was released on 3 September 2014, along with promotional posters and photos. The official theatrical trailer was released online on 19 September 2014. It premiered on 16 October 2014, at the Genesis Deluxe Cinema, The Palms in Lekki, Lagos, and was generally released in movie theatres on 24 October 2014.

Reception

Critical reception
The film has been positively received since its release; Bello and Ekpeyong have been generally described as the standout couple in the film. Most critics however noted that Okeke is unable to get out of his Tinsel character, and that the chemistry between Opia and Okeke is almost non-existent (or not harnessed) on screen. Nollywood Reinvented gave it a 41%, mentioning that there is not much more to this than the purest and most basic form of a 'chic flick'. Sodas and Popcorn gave a 4 out of 5 stars and concluded: "When Love Happens is a well-directed movie, with a lovely cast and crew. It delivers a very fun time. If you are a fan of simple, fun and family healthy comedies, you would love this one". Toni Kan commends the scripting and the performances from the actors, concluding that: "Over all, this is a delightful movie that does Nollywood proud".<ref>{{cite web|url=http://www.sabinews.com/all-news/movie-review-what-happens-when-love-happens/|title=MOVIE REVIEW: WHAT HAPPENS "WHEN LOVE HAPPENS by Toni Kan|author=Kan|first=Toni|authorlink=Toni Kan|date=26 October 2014|website=Sabinews|archive-url=https://web.archive.org/web/20141029010413/http://www.sabinews.com/all-news/movie-review-what-happens-when-love-happens/|archive-date=29 October 2014|url-status=dead|accessdate=28 October 2014}}</ref> Efeturi Doghudje of 360Nobs praised the picture quality and music, but noted that the film dragged a bit due to presence of unnecessary scenes and long dialogues, which could've been edited. She rated the film 4 out of 10 stars and concluded: "for a first feature film, When Love Happens was something more than an ordinary. It is an easy-going RomCom, with a well thought out cast and a great production". Movie Pencil commended the scripting and production quality. It gave the film 4 out of 5 stars, describing it as a "feel good experience".

AccoladesWhen Love Happens'' received nominations at the 2015 Africa Magic Viewers Choice Awards in three categories, including "Best Actress in a Comedy" for Opia and "Best Supporting Actor" for Ukeje.

See also
 List of Nigerian films of 2014

References

External links

When Love Happens  on Demand Africa

English-language Nigerian films
2014 romantic comedy-drama films
Nigerian romantic comedy-drama films
Films shot in Lagos
Films set in Lagos
2014 films
2014 comedy films
2014 drama films
2010s English-language films
Nigerian romantic comedy films